The Old Philadelphia Presbyterian Church is a historic church in Quincy, Florida. It is located five miles north of Quincy, off SR 65 on County Road 272. On February 24, 1975, it was added to the U.S. National Register of Historic Places.

References

External links

 Gadsden County listings at National Register of Historic Places
 Florida's Office of Cultural and Historical Programs
 Gadsden County listings
 Gadsden County markers
 Old Philadelphia Presbyterian Church

Churches in Gadsden County, Florida
Churches on the National Register of Historic Places in Florida
Presbyterian churches in Florida
National Register of Historic Places in Gadsden County, Florida